Cocaine Cowboys is a 1979 American crime drama film directed by Ulli Lommel and written by Lommel, Spencer Compton, Tom Sullivan and Victor Bockris. It stars Jack Palance, Sullivan, and Andy Warhol who made a cameo appearance. It was actor Tzi Ma's film debut.

The film is about cocaine dealing members of a rock band who get into trouble with the American Mafia.

Plot summary
Cocaine Cowboys is about cocaine dealing members of a rock band who get into trouble with the American Mafia.

Andy Warhol appeared as himself.

Reception
The film was given a very negative review at the time of its release by Tom Buckley in The New York Times. Buckley wrote that apart from a good performance by Jack Palance, the other actors were "obvious amateurs", the story "flimsy", the dialogue poor and despite previous acting and directing successes Ulli Lommel's direction was "rudimentary".

When mentioned in a Reuters news article in 2007 the film was referred to as a "clunker".

Filmmakers Quentin Tarantino and Roger Avary both praised the film on the first episode of The Video Archives Podcast.

Film set

Cocaine Cowboys was filmed in 1979 at Warhol's summer home in Montauk, East Hampton, Long Island, New York.

Selected cast
Jack Palance
Tom Sullivan
Andy Warhol

References

External links

1979 films
1979 crime drama films
Films set in New York (state)
Films shot in New York (state)
Andy Warhol
American crime drama films
1970s English-language films
1970s American films
Films directed by Ulli Lommel